Job Mathew Raikes (1767–1833) was a British merchant and banker born in Essex England.

Raikes married Charlotte Bayly, daughter of Nathaniel Bayly, MP, and colonial plantation owner in Jamaica. Charles Raikes (1812–1885), East India Company servant and writer on India, was their son.

References 

1767 births
1833 deaths
British bankers
Raikes family